Sundarpur  is a Village Development Committee in Mahottari District in the Janakpur Zone of south-eastern Nepal. At the time of the 1991 Nepal census it had a population of 8971 people residing in 1766 individua

ReferencesAnd It's Popular for Arising And Starting Point of  River from North- West Side And Near By village Magarthana is well known asides Places and Popular For Temple of Shiva Commonly Knowns As "Mangal- Nath".

External links
UN map of the municipalities of Mahottari District

Populated places in Mahottari District